Jai Hind High school, Ankola is one of the oldest high schools in Uttar Kannada. The high school was built in 1896 during British people rule in India. Formerly it was known as Edward New English School. The school was  built by Vamanrao M.Dubhashi.

The former headmasters
 Vamanrao M. Dubhashi (The founder headmaster)(1896–1900)
 Baburao M. Naik (1900–1902)
 Narahari Phene (1902–1907)
 Narayan G. Nadakarni (1907–1919)
 Vishwanath P. Prabhu (1919–1922)
 Shridhar V. Bhat (1922–1924)
 K. Padmanabh Prabhu (1924–1925)
 Narayan M. Moodbhatkal (1925–1951)
 Shankar P. Pikle (1951–1969)
 Yashavant M. Kamat (1969-1075)
 Manohar V. Gaitonde(1975–1976)
 R. K. Naik (1976–1989)
 G. J. Nayak (1989–1996)
 Arundhati Nayak (1996–2002)
 S. G. Bhat
 Shakuntala Shanbhag
 R. S. Kamat
 Vittal Ager

References

High schools and secondary schools in Karnataka
Schools in Uttara Kannada district
Educational institutions established in 1896
1896 establishments in India